Scott McGill (born September 20, 1998) is an American cyclist, who currently rides for UCI ProTeam .

He took his first major professional win at the 2022 Volta a Portugal, where he won the first and sixth stages.

Major results

Road
2019
 2nd Overall Tour of Tobago
1st Stages 2 & 5
2022
 1st Bucks County Classic
 1st Wilmington Grand Prix
 Volta a Portugal
1st  Points classification
1st Stages 1 & 6
 3rd Criterium, National Road Championships
 6th Overall Joe Martin Stage Race

Cyclo-cross
2021–2022
 2nd North Carolina Grand Prix Day 2
 New England Cyclocross Series
3rd The Northampton International
 4th Pan American Championships
2022–2023
 2nd Major Taylor Cross Cup Day 2
 3rd Major Taylor Cross Cup Day 1

References

External links

1998 births
Living people
American male cyclists
Cyclo-cross cyclists
20th-century American people
21st-century American people
Cyclists from Maryland